The Lawrence School, Lovedale (formerly known as Lawrence Memorial Royal Military School, the namesake of its founder Brigadier-General Sir Henry Montgomery Lawrence KCB), is a co-educational boarding school located at Lovedale, which is a little town on the Nilgiri Mountains in the south Indian state of Tamil Nadu.

Lawrence had mooted the idea of establishing a chain of British Raj military-style boarding schools at the hill stations of India to educate the children of the deceased and serving members of the British Indian Army. Although Lawrence was killed at The Residency, Lucknow during the Indian Rebellion of 1857 his dream took shape and four such schools, known as the Lawrence Military Asylums, were established: at Sanawar in 1847, and at Mount Abu in 1856, both during his lifetime; then at Lovedale, Ootacamund in 1858 and at Ghora Gali, Murree, in present-day Pakistan in 1860.

Name, emblem and motto
In 1913, the name of the school was changed from The Ootacamund Lawrence Asylum to Lawrence Memorial School. After being accorded royal patronage in 1922, the name of the school was changed to the Lawrence Memorial Royal Military School in 1925. In 1949, soon after Indian Independence, the school was handed over to the civilian authorities of the Government of India; subsequently, the name of the school was changed to The Lawrence School, as it is known today. As the school is located in Lovedale, the school is also simply referred to as "Lovedale".

The school's motto is "Never Give In" as that of its sister schools.

The school's logo is an armorial achievement with a historical heraldic blazon:
 
ARMS: Ermine, on a cross raguly gules and eastern crown or; on a chief azure two swords in saltire proper, pommels and hilts gold, between as many leopards' heads argent.

CREST: Out of an eastern crown or, a cubit arm entwined by a wreath of laurel and holding a dagger all proper.

The campus

The Lawrence School, Lovedale has its campus on 750 acres leased from the Ministry of Defence in Lovedale, which is 6 kilometres (3.7 miles) from Ootacamund. Located at a height of 7200 feet above mean sea level, it is slightly lower than the Dodabetta peak (altitude: 8650 feet), which is the highest peak of the Nilgiris mountain range.

The school campus is divided into Preparatory School (classes 5 ), Junior School (classes 6–8) and Senior School (classes 9–12). Some of the classrooms and dormitories of the schools are together in their respective buildings, whereas the girls of class (5–8) are accommodated in the Preparatory School building and the girls of classes (9–12) are accommodated in a separate residential building called Girls School. Therefore, the girls of class 5 attend classes in the Preparatory School, girls of classes (6–8) attend classes in Junior School and girls of classes (9–12) attend classes in the Senior School building.

Many notable personalities, such as former Prime Ministers and Presidents of India Jawaharlal Nehru, Indira Gandhi, Zail Singh, Pranab Mukherjee, A. P. J. Abdul Kalam, and others such as Sam Manekshaw, Venkaiah Naidu and Kiran Bedi, have visited this campus to grace the school's Founder's day and other special occasions.

Architecture 

The Senior School (often referred to as Boys' School) is housed in a magnificent two-story building with a towering campanile of 130 feet, built in Italian Gothic style and designed by Architect Robert Chisholm.

On May 31, 1988, a commemorative postage stamp was issued by India Post to commemorate 130 years of its existence with an image displaying the towering campanile section.

Student Body 
The student body is from all over India and overseas, and is led by prefects headed by a head girl and head boy. The school also has a 40 percent reservation of seats and a 20 percent fee subsidy for children of Indian Defence personnel.

Management
The school is governed by an autonomous body, the Board of Governors, which is appointed by the Ministry of Human Resources Development, Government of India, and is managed operationally by the headmaster or headmistress, who is an ex officio member of the Board as well as the Member Secretary. Additionally, the General Officer Commanding – South India (GOC) Indian Army is also an ex officio member of the Board. The Board also has representation from a member of the Old Lawrencians Association (OLA), a member of the Parent Teacher Association (PTA), and any other nominees of the Ministry of Education, Government of India.

Alumni association
The school's alumni association, the Old Lawrencians Association, has chapters and branches in several major Indian and international cities. This body is registered under the Tamil Nadu Societies Act and is run by a Managing Committee consisting of an elected team drawn from the registered alumni of the association.

Notable alumni
Alumni are generally referred to as "OLs", "Old Lawrencians" or "Old Laws".

Public Servants and Social Workers

 Vice Admiral Anil Chopra (Retired), sailor, military officer, former Flag Officer Commanding-in-Chief Eastern Naval Command
Rear Admiral K. Raja Menon (Retired), sailor, military officer, author, former Assistant Chief of Naval Staff
Nikhil Dey, social activist
Nomita Chandy, social worker
Palanivel Thiagarajan, politician, Tamil Nadu Council of Ministers for Finance and Human Resources Management, MLA Tamil Nadu Legislative Assembly
 Paul Sabapathy CVO CBE, accountant, social worker, former Lord Lieutenant of the West Midlands
Rear Admiral Philipose George Pynumootil, Flag Officer Naval Aviation

Justices and Lawyers
 Honourable Justice A. K. Jayasankaran Nambiar, Judge, High Court of Kerala
 Aryama Sundaram, Senior Advocate, Supreme Court of India

Professionals, Industrialists and Entrepreneurs

 Anand Mahindra, businessman, Chairman & Managing Director Mahindra Group
 Arun M. Kumar, accountant, chairman and CEO KPMG India, former Assistant Secretary of Commerce & Director General of the U.S. and Foreign Commercial service
C Vijayakumar, business executive, President & CEO HCL Technologies
K. V. L. Narayan Rao, journalist, business executive, former CEO NDTV
M. M. Murugappan, businessman, Executive Chairman Murugappa Group
Sashi Reddi, serial entrepreneur, venture capitalist, philanthropist
Thiru Vikram, inventor, entrepreneur, CEO Buffalo Automation

Artists, Academics and Authors
Akshaye Khanna, film actor
Alphonse Putharen, film actor, director and producer
Amish Tripathi, novelist
Anjolie Ela Menon, visual artist
Arundhati Roy, writer and social activist
Fahad Fazil, film actor and producer
Nalini Ambady, social psychologist and author
Pratap K. Pothen, film actor, producer and director
Ram Charan, film actor and producer
Sanaya Irani, film and television actress
Vijay Menon, film actor, producer and director
Sportspersons
Tashi and Nungshi Malik, mountaineers
Beauty Pageant Winners

 Gul Panag, Miss India 1999, film actor, politician

Affiliations
The curriculum is affiliated with the Central Board of Secondary Education
Member of Indian Public Schools' Conference
Aegis of the Ministry of Education (MoE)
Member of Round Square International

See also

The Lawrence School, Sanawar
 Lawrence School, Ghora Gali
 St. Joseph's Higher Secondary School, Ooty
 St. Joseph's Boys School, Coonoor
 Breeks Memorial School, Ooty
 Hebron School, Ooty
 The Laidlaw Memorial School and Junior College, Ketti, Ooty
 Woodside School, Ooty
 Stanes Hr.Sec. School, Coonoor
 Good Shepherd International School, Ooty
 Montfort School, Yercaud

References

 https://www.bbc.com/news/uk-england-birmingham-34228047
 https://www.shropshirestar.com/news/2013/06/16/seven-people-from-shropshire-are-honoured-by-the-queen/

External links

Official website of The Lawrence School, Lovedale 
 Official Website of the registered alumni body – Old Lawrencians Association 

Round Square schools
Boarding schools in Tamil Nadu
High schools and secondary schools in Tamil Nadu
Schools in Nilgiris district
1858 establishments in British India
Educational institutions established in 1858